Sunflow is an open-source global illumination rendering system written in Java. The project is currently inactive;  the last announcement on the program's official page was made in 2007.

References

External links

 Sunflow Rendering System website 
 Sunflow Forum
 Sunflow documentation wiki

3D rendering software for Linux
Computer-aided design software for Linux
Cross-platform software
Free 3D graphics software
Free computer-aided design software
Free software programmed in Java (programming language)
Global illumination software